Oleksandr Oleksandrovych Yatsyk (born 3 January 2003) is a Ukrainian professional footballer who plays as a central midfielder for Dynamo Kyiv.

Club career
Yatsyk made his debut for Dynamo Kyiv on 23 August 2022, playing as a second-half substitute player in a losing away match against Portuguese club Benfica in the 2022–23 UEFA Champions League play-off round.

References

External links
 
 

2003 births
Living people
Footballers from Kyiv
Ukrainian footballers
Ukraine youth international footballers
Association football midfielders
FC Dynamo Kyiv players